The 8th Ryder Cup Matches were held 16–17 September 1949, at Ganton Golf Club in Scarborough, North Yorkshire, England. The United States team won the competition by a score of seven to five.

Still recovering from his near-fatal automobile accident in February, Ben Hogan was the non-playing captain of the U.S. team. He returned as a competitor for a final time in 1951.

The U.S. team's decision to bring a half ton of meat to England made headlines.

Hogan objected to the depth of the grooves on some British players' irons, and they were modified before being allowed into the competition. Britain led three to one after the first day, but the U.S. won six of eight matches in singles on Saturday to keep the Cup.

The Ganton course measured  for this Ryder Cup.

Format
The Ryder Cup is a match play event, with each match worth one point.  From 1927 through 1959, the format consisted of four foursome (alternate shot) matches on the first day and eight singles matches on the second day, for a total of 12 points.  Therefore, 6 points were required to win the Cup.  All matches were played to a maximum of 36 holes.

Teams
Source:

In April 1949 the British P.G.A. appointed a selection committee of five. The committee consisted of four ex-Ryder Cup players: Dick Burton, Arthur Havers, Alf Padgham and Charles Whitcombe to which would be added the chairman of the P.G.A. to be elected in July. In mid-July a list of 20 possible players was announced, although other players could be added to this list. Charles Whitcombe was announced as the non-playing captain. The list included Henry Cotton who later withdrew because he was returning to his golf school in Monte Carlo and would "have no opportunity to sharpen up his game." The team was selected immediately after the News Chronicle Tournament, a tournament won by Dick Burton, one of the selectors, by 12 strokes. The team was chosen from the 19 remaining possible players announced in July.

Friday's foursome matches

18 hole scores: Faulkner/Adams: 3 up, Daly/Bousfield: 2 up, Demaret/Heafner: 1 up, Burton/Lees v Snead/Mangrum: all square.

Saturday's singles matches

18 hole scores: Harrison: 7 up, Adams: 1 up, Snead: 1 up, Rees: 4 up, Burton: 1 up, Harbert: 5 up, Demaret: 5 up, Mangrum: 1 up.

Individual player records
Each entry refers to the win–loss–half record of the player.

Source:

Great Britain

Laurie Ayton, Jnr did not play in any matches.

United States

References

External links
PGA of America: 1949 Ryder Cup
About.com: 1949 Ryder Cup

Ryder Cup
Golf tournaments in England
Sport in Scarborough, North Yorkshire
Ryder Cup
Ryder Cup
Ryder Cup